Sioux Rapids is a city in Buena Vista County, Iowa, United States. The population was 748 at the time of the 2020 census.

History
Sioux Rapids was named from the Rapids on the Little Sioux River. In 1869, Sioux Rapids was designated the county seat of Buena Vista County. In 1876, the courthouse at Sioux Rapids burned, and in 1878, the county seat was transferred to Storm Lake.

Geography
Sioux Rapids is located at  (42.892762, -95.147095). It is located on the Little Sioux River.

Gustafson Lake, as well as Gabrielson Park, are located south of the town.

Climate

Demographics

2010 census
As of the census of 2010, there were 775 people, 325 households, and 196 families residing in the city. The racial makeup of the city was 94.3% White, 0.6% African American, 0.1% Native American, 0.4% Asian, 3.9% from other races, and 0.6% from two or more races. Hispanic or Latino of any race were 8.4% of the population.

There were 325 households, of which 30.5% had children under the age of 18 living with them, 45.2% were married couples living together, 9.5% had a female householder with no husband present, 5.5% had a male householder with no wife present, and 39.7% were non-families. 36.9% of all households were made up of individuals, and 14.8% had someone living alone who was 65 years of age or older. The average household size was 2.30 and the average family size was 3.02.

The median age in the city was 40.8 years. 26.7% of residents were under the age of 18; 5% were between the ages of 18 and 24; 23.2% were from 25 to 44; 25.2% were from 45 to 64; and 19.9% were 65 years of age or older. The gender makeup of the city was 49.8% male and 50.2% female.

2000 census
As of the census of 2000, there were 720 people, 306 households, and 201 families residing in the city. The racial makeup of the city was 98.75% White, 0.14% Asian, 0.28% from other races, and 0.83% from two or more races. Hispanic or Latino of any race were 1.39% of the population.

There were 306 households, out of which 27.5% had children under the age of 18 living with them, 52.6% were married couples living together, 9.8% had a female householder with no husband present, and 34.0% were non-families. 31.7% of all households were made up of individuals, and 16.7% had someone living alone who was 65 years of age or older. The average household size was 2.28 and the average family size was 2.84.

In the city, the population was spread out, with 24.9% under the age of 18, 7.1% from 18 to 24, 22.5% from 25 to 44, 21.9% from 45 to 64, and 23.6% who were 65 years of age or older. The median age was 42 years. For every 100 females, there were 94.6 males. For every 100 females age 18 and over, there were 86.6 males.

The median income for a household in the city was $33,250, and the median income for a family was $40,417. Males had a median income of $35,000 versus $18,929 for females. The per capita income for the city was $16,759. About 5.8% of families and 6.4% of the population were below the poverty line, including 7.4% of those under age 18 and 4.6% of those age 65 or over.

Arts and culture
Sioux Rapids hosts its "Tall Corn Days" festival every year near the end of July.  In the past, this has included a parade, street dance, sweet corn feed, a 5k run/walk, a kids fire fight game, a lunch at the city park, and various sports tournaments.

The town is home to several churches, including a Lutheran, Baptist, and Methodist denominations.

Sioux Rapids also has an historical museum/theater, a swimming pool, an American Legion Post, a community center, and various local businesses.

Education
Sioux Central Community School District serves the community; it operates a K-12 school south of Sioux Rapids on Highway 71.

Before the consolidation, Sioux Rapids had its own school near the center of the town. Sioux Rapids was a part of the Sioux Rapids Community School District until July 1, 1979, when it merged with the Rembrandt school district to form the Sioux Rapids-Rembrandt School District. That district consolidated with the Sioux Valley School District into Sioux Central on July 1, 1993.

Transportation
U.S. Route 71 (concurrently with Highway 10) runs north–south through Sioux Rapids, with Spencer situated approximately 18 miles north on 71 and Storm Lake approximately 20 miles south. Sioux Rapids is also about 45 minutes south of Okoboji.

Notable people

Guy Gabrielson (1891–1976) New Jersey Republican politician.
Ira Noel Gabrielson (1889–1977) American naturalist and entomologist.
Fleta Jan Brown Spencer (1882-1938), composer and songwriter, born near Sioux Rapids.

References

External links

  
Sioux Rapids, Iowa city website
City-Data Comprehensive Statistical Data and more about Sioux Rapids

Cities in Buena Vista County, Iowa
Cities in Iowa